Alessio Militari (born 15 January 1999) is an Italian football player who plays as midfielder.

Club career

Cesena
On 7 August 2017, Militari made his professional debut against Serie C club Sambenedettese in Coppa Italia.

Bologna
On 26 July 2018, Militari signed with Serie A club Bologna for free.

Loan to Renate
On 18 July 2019, he joined Renate on loan.

Mantova
On 1 September 2020 he moved to Mantova. He left the club at the end of the 2020–21 season as his contract expired. After not playing in the first half of the 2021–22 season, on 9 December 2021 he returned to Mantova.

References

External links
 

1999 births
Living people
Footballers from Rome
Italian footballers
Association football midfielders
Serie C players
A.C. Cesena players
Bologna F.C. 1909 players
A.C. Renate players
Mantova 1911 players
Italy youth international footballers